Fulwood is a surname. Notable people with the surname include:

Anne Fulwood (born 1959), Australian newsreader
Charles Fulwood (born 1950), media strategist
Isaac Fulwood (1940–2017), American police officer
Tiki Fulwood (1944–1979), American musician
Wayne Fulwood, drummer